Ernest Phillips (born 29 November 1923 in North Shields, England, died 10 January 2004) was an English footballer.

Phillips joined Manchester City from non-league side Ashington in 1948. He joined Hull City in 1951. He joined York City in 1954, where he was a part of the team which played in the FA Cup semi-final in 1955. He then re-joined non-league side Ashington in 1958.

Notes

1923 births
Sportspeople from North Shields
Footballers from Tyne and Wear
2004 deaths
English footballers
Association football defenders
Ashington A.F.C. players
Manchester City F.C. players
Hull City A.F.C. players
York City F.C. players